The 1970 NBA Expansion Draft was the fifth expansion draft of the National Basketball Association (NBA). The draft was held on May 11, 1970, so that the newly founded Buffalo Braves, Cleveland Cavaliers and Portland Trail Blazers could acquire players for the upcoming 1970–71 season. Buffalo, Cleveland and Portland had been awarded the expansion teams on February 6, 1970. The Braves later underwent several name changes and relocations before moving to San Diego in 1978, and to Los Angeles in 1984. They are currently known as the Los Angeles Clippers. In an NBA expansion draft, new NBA teams are allowed to acquire players from the previously established teams in the league. Not all players on a given team are available during an expansion draft, since each team can protect a certain number of players from being selected. In this draft, each of the fourteen other NBA teams had protected seven players from their roster. After each round, where each of the expansion teams had selected one player each, the existing teams added another player to their protected list. In the first round, the Braves had the first pick, while the Blazers and the Cavaliers had the second and the third pick respectively. In the subsequent rounds, the Braves and the Cavaliers exchanged their order of selection, while the Blazers had the second pick throughout the draft. The draft continued until all three teams had selected eleven unprotected players each, while the existing teams had lost two or three players each.

The Buffalo Braves were formed and owned by local businessman Paul Snyder. He hired former Philadelphia 76ers head coach and  Coach of the Year Dolph Schayes as the franchise's first head coach. The Braves' selections included six-time All-Star Bailey Howell. However, Howell was immediately traded to the Philadelphia 76ers in exchange for Bob Kauffman and a future second-round pick. Nine players from the expansion draft joined the Braves for their inaugural season, but only three played more than one season for the team.

The Cleveland Cavaliers were formed and owned by businessman Nick Mileti. He hired former college basketball coach Bill Fitch as the franchise's first head coach. The Cavaliers' selections included five-time All-Star Don Ohl and one-time All-Star Len Chappell. However, Ohl retired from playing prior to the start of the season and Chappell only played briefly before he was waived. Eight players from the expansion draft joined the Cavaliers for their inaugural season, but only four played more than one season for the team. Butch Beard was the ninth player from the expansion draft to play for the Cavaliers. After one year serving in the military, he started playing with the Cavaliers in the 1971–72 season. Bingo Smith played nine and a half seasons with the Cavaliers before he was traded to the San Diego Clippers in 1979. He became the Cavaliers' franchise leader in games played when he left, a record which has since been broken by Danny Ferry and Žydrūnas Ilgauskas.

The Portland Trail Blazers were formed by Harry Glickman, who created the franchise through the financiers turned co-owners Larry Weinberg, Herman Sarkowsky and Robert Shmertz. They hired former college basketball coach Rolland Todd as the franchise's first head coach. The Blazers' selections included former first overall pick Fred Hetzel and former third pick Larry Siegfried. However, Hetzel was waived without playing a game for the Blazers and Siegfried was immediately traded to the San Diego Rockets in exchange for Jim Barnett. Six players from the expansion draft joined the Blazers for their inaugural season, but only three played more than one season for the team.

Key

Selections

Notes
 Number of years played in the NBA prior to the draft
 Career with the expansion franchise that drafted the player
 Never played a game for the franchise

References
General

Specific

External links
NBA.com
NBA.com: NBA Draft History

Expansion
Los Angeles Clippers lists
Cleveland Cavaliers lists
Portland Trail Blazers lists
National Basketball Association expansion draft
National Basketball Association lists
NBA expansion draft